George Small is an American musician, composer and record producer, who is active in the New York music scene. He has a wide variety of credits that include hit recordings, live performances with musicians (Broadway, concert and TV) and extensive productions and original compositions. His keyboard work is featured on John Lennon & Yoko Ono's album Double Fantasy and the follow up, Milk and Honey. He played downbeats on "(Just Like) Starting Over" and a piano accompaniment on "Watching the Wheels".

George Small has also worked with Carl Perkins, Graham Parker, artist Andy Warhol, Eric Clapton, John Phillips and many others.

References

American pop pianists
American pop keyboardists
American record producers
American jazz organists
Year of birth missing (living people)
Living people